"I Wanna Love You Forever" is the debut single of American recording artist Jessica Simpson. The song was released on August 30, 1999, by Columbia Records as the lead single from Simpson's debut studio album, Sweet Kisses (1999). Written and produced by Louis Biancaniello and Sam Watters, "I Wanna Love You Forever" is a pop power ballad.

Upon its release, "I Wanna Love You Forever" received positive reviews from critics, many praised Simpson's vocal performance. It achieved international success, and established Simpson's name in the music industry. The song reached number three on the Billboard Hot 100, becoming Simpson's first, and to date only, top ten single, and was certified platinum by the Recording Industry Association of America (RIAA). Elsewhere, the single reached the top 10 in seven countries and the top 40 in 11 additional countries.

An accompanying music video for "I Wanna Love You Forever" was directed by Bille Woodruff. It centers on Jessica in a photo shoot while she also poses around a field of sunflowers. The single is generally considered to be one of her signature songs, and is her most successful single in the United States to date.

Background
Simpson first developed and nurtured her talent in her local Baptist church, where her father also worked as the congregation's youth minister. At age twelve, she unsuccessfully auditioned for The Mickey Mouse Club. While attending a church camp, at the age of 13, Simpson sang "I Will Always Love You" and an arrangement of "Amazing Grace". One of the camp's visitors was launching a Gospel music record label and saw great promise and profits in her voice. It was during this time, while attending J. J. Pearce High School, Simpson signed to Proclaim Records, a minor Gospel music record label. She recorded an album, Jessica, but Proclaim went bankrupt and the album was never officially released except for a small pressing funded by her grandmother. This small pressing gained her minor attention which led her to performing at concerts with other gospel legendary acts such as Kirk Franklin, God's Property, and CeCe Winans. When she was sixteen years old, Columbia Records executive Tommy Mottola heard Jessica, he was impressed with Simpson's musical talent and skill. Mottola instantly thought Simpson sounded like Mariah Carey. Simpson was immediately signed to the label. She dropped out of high school but later earned her GED.

Simpson immediately began working with producers such as Louis Biancaniello, Robbie Nevil, Evan Rogers, and Cory Rooney. Biancaniello worked with Simpson on three of the album's eleven tracks, including "I Wanna Love You Forever".

Song information
"I Wanna Love You Forever" was written, composed, and produced by Louis Biancaniello and Sam Watters. The track is a darkly bittersweet love ballad, showing off the powerful vocals of Simpson.

Even though Biancaniello and Watters are credited jointly for writing and composing the song, at present, it is not known exactly which of the two wrote its lyrics and which composed its music. According to the sheet music book published by Hal Leonard Corporation in Musicnotes.com, "I Wanna Love You Forever" is a common time signature song, with a beat rate of 80 beats per minute. It is set in the key of E minor with Simpson's voice ranging from the tonal nodes of F3 to G5, which is 2 octaves and 1 notes. The song follows a basic sequence of I–II–IV–II–VV progression.

Critical reception
The song received generally positive reviews from music critics, many praised Simpson's vocal performance. AllMusic editor Stephen Thomas Erlewine wrote that "I Wanna Love You Forever" gives Simpson "a chance to show off the richness of her voice. She doesn't over-sing, even if she has moments where she pushes the envelope slightly -- just like her idol Dion." J.D. Considine from The Baltimore Sun compared her to singers like Mariah Carey, Whitney Houston and Christina Aguilera, noting the "diva-esque theatrics" on the song. Billboard described it as a "lush melodrama, complete with a raise-the-roof bridge, a theme of desperate devotion (...) and a vocal so fraught with emotion, it'll bring tears to the eyes as it wrings out every potential ounce of feeling from the song." The magazine added that Simpson "has a vocal command Celine would admire" and that the song "is so bombastic that some may consider it cheesy, but it's been a good while since a song of this brand has been issued, making it an instant brow-raiser." Editor Chuck Taylor called it a "deliciously over-the-top ballad" that "swept through the hearts of the nation". Can't Stop the Pop said it "is unashamedly steeped in melodrama", adding that "there’s an unrelenting urgency to her performance where it genuinely feels as if she’s singing for her life".

Elysa Gardner from Los Angeles Times stated that Simpson "obviously [have] been studying Mariah Carey since childhood" and added that the "power ballad" cast her as a "generic diva". Kyle Anderson from MTV complimented Simpson like "a second-generation Celine Dion" and stated that "I Wanna Love You Forever" is a "pretty traditional ballad" and a "towering achievement". He wrote that Simpson "sits back and belts like the Titanic is sinking, and it's produced with a majestic, almost stoic air of dignity. Her voice is for real, and the chorus of the song ("From the moment that I saw your face/ And felt the fire of your sweet embrace/ I swear I knew I'm gonna love you forever") has an epic prom song quality. It's no wonder it nearly topped the Billboard Hot 100." People Magazine said that the song is a "breathless hit". Bob Waliszewski of Plugged In wrote that "I Wanna Love You Forever" "pledges lifelong love to a partner." Jenna Bergstrom from Pueblo Chieftain commented that the song is "so powerful" in her review of Sweet Kisses. Sun-Sentinel said that Simpson "has a powerful voice that gives a new sound to pop music." Vibe noted the song as "beautiful" and added that it is "a classic big ballad, complete with seemingly impossible-to-reach high notes and a soaring melody."

Commercial performance

America
In the United States, "I Wanna Love You Forever" was serviced to radio on August 30, 1999, as was released as a CD single on September 28, 1999. It was initially a success in North America in late 1999. The single entered at number sixty-nine position on Billboard Hot 100 in the United States with sales of 18,500 units. It's ranked at number three the following weeks, remaining in that position for five consecutive weeks, with a total of twenty weeks on the music list, eighteen of them among the top forty; the path is the third longest recorded so far by a single singer. The single also reached number one for six consecutive weeks on Hot 100 Singles Sales and was certified Platinum by the RIAA. On January 22, 2000, Billboard reported that "I Wanna Love You Forever" was the 18th best-selling single of 1999, with 800,000 units sold, only in 1999.  "I Wanna Love You Forever" was the eleventh best-selling physical single of the 2000s, according to Nielsen SoundScan. It also became Simpson's best-selling physical single to date.

The single also experienced a significant level of airplay, reaching the top 20 on the Hot 100 Airplay chart.

Europe and Australia
In Europe "I Wanna Love You Forever" successfully entered the charts. The single was positioned at number six for 3 non-consecutive weeks on the Hot 100 Singles European, with fourteen weeks on the music list. In the United Kingdom the single entered directly into the top 10 on March 27, 2000; it managed to reach position number 7. The single remained on the chart for eleven weeks, the longest stay among Simpson's singles, matched only by "These Boots Are Made for Walkin". In Sweden the single number five positions for three consecutive weeks, was certified Gold by the local IFPI have passed the 20,000 units sold, remained for fourteen weeks on the music list, and remains Simpson's most successful single in the country to date. The track also debuted at number 17 in Italy.

In Oceania "I Wanna Love You Forever" was a resounding success. In Australia the single entered in twentieth position on February 15, 2000, ascending in its fourth week of stay in the music list at number nine position, where it remained for two consecutive weeks. The single eventually stayed for five consecutive weeks in the top ten positions in the music list, was certified Platinum by the ARIA after passing 70,000. In New Zealand the single entered the February 14, 2000, at number forty-six position, ascending to the next week to the sixteenth position.

Music video

As her debut video, careful attention was made to make sure that Jessica's virginal image would be used as the "anti-sex appeal" to draw viewers in. Directed by Bille Woodruff, the video does not follow the dramatic story told in the song at all and instead centers on Jessica in a photo shoot. The photo shoot starts out with Simpson being photographed in front of a red Waco YMF-5C Biplane as she wears a white outfit with a blue jacket. The song then shifts to a new scene in which Ms. Simpson has removed her jacket and is now in front of sunflowers.

The video seems to take things slowly, but in a dramatic turn of events, the sunflower scene is literally pushed over, to reveal the song's final scene: Simpson covered only in black on a dramatic soundstage lighted with blue lights. The video also features shots intercut with the making of the video of Jessica and her personal girlfriends. One of those girlfriends in the video is Jessica's little sister Ashlee Simpson. Although the video shoot is commonly believed to be a fake one, it appears that the video breaks the fourth wall as photos of the photographer taking photos apparently exist.

Jessica once spoke of the idea for a second video but this one was never made.

The video debuted on TRL on November 23, 1999, at number 10.

Formats and track listings 
These are the formats and track listings of major single releases of "I Wanna Love You Forever".

Charts

Weekly charts

Year-end charts

Certifications and sales

Release history

References

1990s ballads
1999 debut singles
1999 songs
Columbia Records singles
Jessica Simpson songs
Music videos directed by Bille Woodruff
Pop ballads
Songs written by Louis Biancaniello
Songs written by Sam Watters